Harbord may refer to:

People
 Harbord Harbord (1675?–1742), English landowner and Member of Parliament born Harbord Cropley
 Harbord Harbord, 1st Baron Suffield (1734–1810), British landowner and Member of Parliament
 Arthur Harbord (1865–1941), British politician
 Carl Harbord (1908–1958), English actor
 Charles Harbord, 5th Baron Suffield (1830–1914), British courtier and politician
 Charles Harbord, 6th Baron Suffield (1855–1924), British Army officer and politician
 Cyril Harbord (1873–1958), British Indian Army brigadier-general
 Edward Harbord, 3rd Baron Suffield (1781–1835), British politician, anti-slavery campaigner and prison reformer
 Edward Harbord, 4th Baron Suffield (1813–1853), son of the 3rd baron
 Jacqueline Harbord (born 1944), British former figure skater and 1962 national champion
 James Harbord (1866–1947), US Army lieutenant general and business executive
 John Harbord (1812–1896), English Anglican priest and author
 William Harbord (politician) (1635–1692), English Member of Parliament and diplomat
 Sir William Harbord, 1st Baronet (c. 1696–1770), English landowner and Member of Parliament
 William Harbord, 2nd Baron Suffield (1766–1821), English cricketer
 William Harbord (cricketer) (1908–1992), English cricketer

Other uses
 former name of Freshwater, New South Wales, a suburb of Sydney, Australia
 Harbord Glacier, Victoria Land, Antartica
 Harbord Collegiate Institute, a secondary school in Toronto, Canada
 Harbord Street, Toronto, Canada - see Harbord Street Bridge

See also
 Harbord Commission, an American commission tasked by President Wilson to study the relationship between the United States and Armenia following World War I, led by James Harbord

English-language masculine given names